Előd Novák (born 25 April 1980) is a Hungarian politician. He was one of the deputy chairmen of the far-right political party, Jobbik. His wife is Dóra Dúró, a former spokesperson for the party.

After the 2010 elections he was elected to the National Assembly of Hungary. He was a “local assistant” of Csanád Szegedi to the Member of the European Parliament in Brussels. Novák in five months received the salaries, although he is a eurosceptic who in January 2012 burned the European Union's flag at an anti-EU demonstration organized by Jobbik.  In 2015, he was involved in a controversy as deputy leader over his remarks shared on social media where he suggested that the Romani population in Hungary was the biggest problem that the country was facing.

Előd Novák was forced by the party's parliamentary group to resign from his position as an MP in 2016. Now, he is a vocal critic of Jobbik's new policies.

In June 2018 he joined Our Homeland Movement, László Toroczkai's new party with several other Jobbik members.

Personal life
He is married to Dóra Dúró. They have a daughter, Hunóra Kincső (2011) and three sons, Bottyán János (2013), Nimród Nándor (2014) and Zente Levente (2019).

External links
Biography on jobbik.hu

References

1980 births
Living people
Jobbik politicians
Our Homeland Movement politicians
Members of the National Assembly of Hungary (2010–2014)
Members of the National Assembly of Hungary (2014–2018)
Members of the National Assembly of Hungary (2022–2026)
Politicians from Budapest
Hungarian nationalists
Hungarian Justice and Life Party politicians